This is a list of ambassadors from the United States to the Republic of Djibouti.

The area on the Horn of Africa on which Djibouti is situated had been under French control since 1885 as part of the protectorate of French Somaliland. The area was ruled by the Vichy (French) government from the fall of France in 1940 until December 1942, but Free French and the Allied forces recaptured Djibouti at the end of 1942. In 1957 the colony was given a large measure of self-government and became the French Territory of the Afars and the Issas. In a May 1977 referendum the populace chose independence from France. The Republic of Djibouti was established on June 27, 1977.

The United States immediately recognized the nation of Djibouti and moved to establish diplomatic relations. The embassy in Djibouti was established June 27, 1977, with Walter S. Clarke as Chargé d'Affaires ad interim pending the appointment of an ambassador. The first ambassador, Jerrold M. North, was appointed on September 26, 1980.

Ambassadors

See also
Djibouti – United States relations
Foreign relations of Djibouti
Ambassadors of the United States

References
United States Department of State: Background notes on Djibouti

External links
 

Djibouti
Main
United States